is a Japanese long-distance runner. At the 2012 Summer Olympics, he competed in the Men's marathon, finishing in 40th place.

References

Japanese male long-distance runners
Japanese male marathon runners
Living people
Olympic athletes of Japan
Athletes (track and field) at the 2012 Summer Olympics
1984 births
Olympic male marathon runners